José Maria de Eça de Queiroz (25 November 1845 – 16 August 1900) is generally considered to have been the greatest Portuguese writer in the realist style. Zola considered him to be far greater than Flaubert. In the London Observer, Jonathan Keates ranked him alongside Dickens, Balzac and Tolstoy.

Biography
Eça de Queiroz was born in Póvoa de Varzim, Portugal, in 1845. An illegitimate child, he was officially recorded as the son of José Maria de Almeida Teixeira de Queiroz and Carolina Augusta Pereira d'Eça. His unmarried mother left home so that her son could be born away from social scandal. Although his parents married when he was four years old, he lived with his paternal grandparents until he was ten.

At age 16, he went to Coimbra to study law at the University of Coimbra; there he met the poet Antero de Quental. Eça's first work was a series of prose poems, published in the Gazeta de Portugal magazine, which eventually appeared in book form in a posthumous collection edited by Batalha Reis entitled Prosas Bárbaras ("Barbarous texts"). He worked as a journalist at Évora, then returned to Lisbon and, with his former school friend Ramalho Ortigão and others, created the Correspondence of the fictional adventurer Fradique Mendes. This amusing work was first published in 1900.

In 1869 and 1870, Eça de Queiroz travelled to Egypt and watched the opening of the Suez Canal, which inspired several of his works, most notably O Mistério da Estrada de Sintra ("The Mystery of the Sintra Road", 1870), written in collaboration with Ramalho Ortigão, in which Fradique Mendes appears. A Relíquia ("The Relic") was also written at this period but was published only in 1887. The work was strongly influenced by Memorie di Giuda ("Memoirs of Judas") by Ferdinando Petruccelli della Gattina, such as to lead some scholars to accuse the Portuguese writer of plagiarism.

When he was later dispatched to Leiria to work as a municipal administrator, Eça de Queiroz wrote his first realist novel, O Crime do Padre Amaro ("The Sin of Father Amaro"), which is set in the city and first appeared in 1875.

Eça then worked in the Portuguese consular service and after two years' service at Havana was stationed, from late 1874 until April 1879, at 53 Grey Street, Newcastle upon Tyne, where there is a memorial plaque in his honour. His diplomatic duties included the dispatch of detailed reports to the Portuguese foreign office concerning the unrest in the Northumberland and Durham coalfields – in which, as he points out, the miners earned twice as much as those in South Wales, along with free housing and a weekly supply of coal. The Newcastle years were among the most productive of his literary career. He published the second version of O Crime de Padre Amaro in 1876 and another celebrated novel, O Primo Basílio ("Cousin Bazilio") in 1878, as well as working on a number of other projects. These included the first of his "Cartas de Londres" ("Letters from London") which were printed in the Lisbon daily newspaper Diário de Notícias and afterwards appeared in book form as Cartas de Inglaterra. As early as 1878 he had at least given a name to his masterpiece Os Maias ("The Maias"), though this was largely written during his later residence in Bristol and was published only in 1888.

In February 1886, he married Maria Emília de Castro in Lisbon and she joined him in Bristol, with the couple staying in Stoke Bishop. However, Maria Emília was not happy there. As a result they decided to rent a house in Notting Hill, London, and Eça would commute to his work in Bristol. It is unlikely that he would have been unhappy with this arrangement as his earlier letters indicate that he had already made frequent visits to London.  

Eça, a cosmopolite widely read in English literature, was not enamoured of English society, but he was fascinated by its oddity. In Bristol he wrote: "Everything about this society is disagreeable to me – from its limited way of thinking to its indecent manner of cooking vegetables." As often happens when a writer is unhappy, the weather is endlessly bad. Nevertheless, he was rarely bored and was content to stay in England for some fifteen years. "I detest England, but this does not stop me from declaring that as a thinking nation, she is probably the foremost." It may be said that England acted as a constant stimulus and a corrective to Eça's traditionally Portuguese Francophilia.

Eça's politics were of the Liberal stamp, although he was also influenced by the ideas of Pierre-Joseph Proudhon. In 1898, upon growing more pessimistic about the future of Portugal and Europe, he described himself as a "vague, saddened anarchist."

In 1888 he became Portuguese consul-general in Paris, a position he actively sought. He lived at Neuilly-sur-Seine and continued to write journalism (Ecos de Paris, "Echoes from Paris") as well as literary criticism. He died in 1900 of either tuberculosis or, according to numerous contemporary physicians, Crohn's disease. His son António Eça de Queiroz would hold government office under António de Oliveira Salazar. He was first buried in a family vault in Prazeres Cemetery and later exhumed and moved to a grave in Santa Cruz do Douro Cemetery, in Baião Municipality, Portugal

Works by Eça de Queiroz

O Mistério da Estrada de Sintra ("The Mystery of the Sintra Road") 1870, in collaboration with Ramalho Ortigão
O Crime do Padre Amaro ("The Sin of Father Amaro", 1875, revised 1876, revised 1880)
O Primo Basílio ("Cousin Bazilio", 1878)
O Mandarim (The Mandarin, 1880)
As Minas de Salomão, translation of H. Rider Haggard's King Solomon's Mines (1885)
A Relíquia 1887 ("The Relic", 1994)
Os Maias ("The Maias", 1888)
Uma Campanha Alegre ("A Cheerful Campaign") (1890–1891)
Correspondence of Fradique Mendes, 1890
A Ilustre Casa de Ramires, 1900; ("The Illustrious House of Ramires", 2017)

Posthumous works
A Cidade e as Serras ("The City and the Mountains", 1901, Posthumous)
Contos ("Stories") (1902, Posthumous)
Prosas Bárbaras ("Barbarous Texts", 1903, Posthumous)
Cartas de Inglaterra ("Letters from England") (1905, Posthumous)
Ecos de Paris ("Echos from Paris") (1905, Posthumous)
Cartas Familiares e Bilhetes de Paris ("Family Letters and Notes from Paris") (1907, Posthumous)
Notas Contemporâneas ("Contemporary Notes") (1909, Posthumous)
São Cristóvão, published in English in 2015 as Saint Christopher. Originally published in Portuguese as part of the volume Últimas páginas ("Last Pages") (1912, Posthumous)
A Capital ("To the Capital") (1925, Posthumous)
O Conde d'Abranhos ("The Earl of Abranhos") (1925 Posthumous)
Alves & C.a ("Alves & Co."). (1925, Posthumous) published in English as "The Yellow Sofa", and as "Alves & Co." in 2012 by Dedalus
O Egipto ("Egypt", 1926, Posthumous)
A Tragédia da Rua das Flores ("The Tragedy of the Street of Flowers") (1980, Posthumous)

Periodicals to which Eça de Queiroz contributed
Gazeta de Portugal
As Farpas (The Barbs)
Diário de Notícias

Translations

The works of Eça have been translated into about 20 languages, including English.

Since 2002 English versions of eight of his novels and two volumes of novellas and short stories, translated by Margaret Jull Costa, have been published in the UK by Dedalus Books.

A capital (To the Capital): translation by John Vetch, Carcanet Press (UK), 1995.
A Cidade e as serras (The City and the Mountains): translation by Roy Campbell, Ohio University Press, 1968.
A Ilustre Casa de Ramires (The illustrious house of Ramires): translation by Ann Stevens, Ohio University Press, 1968; translation by Margaret Jull Costa, Dedalus Books, 2017
A Relíquia (The Relic): translation by Aubrey F. Bell, A. A. Knopf, 1925. Also published as The Reliquary, Reinhardt, 1954.
A Relíquia (The Relic): translation by Margaret Jull Costa, Dedalus Books, 1994.
A tragédia da rua das Flores (The Tragedy of the Street of Flowers): translation by Margaret Jull Costa, Dedalus Books, 2000.
Alves & Cia (Alves & Co.): translation by Robert M. Fedorchek, University Press of America, 1988.
Cartas da Inglaterra (Letters from England): translation by Ann Stevens, Bodley Head, 1970. Also published as Eça's English Letters, Carcanet Press, 2000.
O Crime do Padre Amaro (El crimen del Padre Amaro): Versión de Ramón del Valle – Inclan, Editorial Maucci, 1911
O Crime do Padre Amaro (The Sin of Father Amaro): translation by Nan Flanagan, Bodley Head, 1962. Also published as The Crime of Father Amaro, Carcanet Press, 2002.
O Crime do Padre Amaro (The Crime of Father Amaro): translation by Margaret Jull Costa, Dedalus Books, 2002.
O Mandarim (The Mandarin in The Mandarin and Other Stories): translation by Richard Frank Goldman, Ohio University Press, 1965. Also published by Bodley Head, 1966; and Hippocrene Books, 1993.
Um Poeta Lírico (A Lyric Poet in The Mandarin and Other Stories): translation by Richard Frank Goldman, Ohio University Press, 1965. Also published by Bodley Head, 1966; and Hippocrene Books, 1993.
Singularidades de uma Rapariga Loura (Peculiarities of a Fair-haired Girl in The Mandarin and Other Stories): translation by Richard Frank Goldman, Ohio University Press, 1965. Also published by Bodley Head, 1966; and Hippocrene Books, 1993.
José Mathias (José Mathias in The Mandarin and Other Stories): translation by Richard Frank Goldman, Ohio University Press, 1965. Also published by Bodley Head, 1966; and Hippocrene Books, 1993.
O Mandarim (The Mandarin in The Mandarin and Other Stories): translation by Margaret Jull Costa, Hippocrene Books, 1983.
O Mandarim (The Mandarin in The Mandarin and Other Stories): translation by Margaret Jull Costa, Dedalus Books, 2009.
José Mathias (José Mathias in The Mandarin and Other Stories): translation by Margaret Jull Costa, Dedalus Books, 2009.
O Defunto (The Hanged Man in The Mandarin and Other Stories): translation by Margaret Jull Costa, Dedalus Books, 2009.
Singularidades de uma Rapariga Loura (Idiosyncrasies of a young blonde woman in The Mandarin and Other Stories): translation by Margaret Jull Costa, Dedalus Books, 2009.
O Primo Basílio (Dragon's teeth): translation by Mary Jane Serrano, R. F. Fenno & Co., 1896.
O Primo Basílio (Cousin Bazilio): translation by Roy Campbell, Noonday Press, 1953.
O Primo Basílio (Cousin Bazilio): translation by Margaret Jull Costa, Dedalus Books, 2003.
Suave milagre (The Sweet Miracle): translation by Edgar Prestage, David Nutt, 1905. Also published as The Fisher of Men, T. B. Mosher, 1905; The Sweetest Miracle, T. B. Mosher, 1906; The Sweet Miracle, B. H. Blakwell, 1914.
Os Maias (The Maias): translation by Ann Stevens and Patricia McGowan Pinheiro, St. Martin's Press, 1965.
Os Maias (The Maias): translation by Margaret Jull Costa, New Directions, 2007.
O Defunto (Our Lady of the Pillar): translation by Edgar Prestage, Archibald Constable, 1906.
Pacheco (Pacheco): translation by Edgar Prestage, Basil Blackwell, 1922.
A Perfeição (Perfection): translation by Charles Marriott, Selwyn & Blovnt, 1923.
José Mathias (José Mathias in José Mathias and A Man of Talent): translation by Luís Marques, George G. Harap & Co., 1947.
Pacheco (A man of talent in José Mathias and A Man of Talent): translation by Luís Marques, George G. Harap & Co., 1947.
Alves & Cia (The Yellow Sofa in Yellow Sofa and Three Portraits): translation by John Vetch, Carcanet Press, 1993. Also published by New Directions, 1996. Published as Alves & Co. by Dedalus in 2012.
Um Poeta Lírico (Lyric Poet in Yellow Sofa and Three Portraits): translation by John Vetch, Carcanet Press, 1993. Also published by New Directions, 1996.
José Mathias (José Mathias in Yellow Sofa and Three Portraits): translation by Luís Marques, Carcanet Press, 1993. Also published by New Directions, 1996.
Pacheco (A man of talent in Yellow Sofa and Three Portraits): translation by Luís Marques, Carcanet Press, 1993. Also published by New Directions, 1996.
O Mistério da Estrada de Sintra (The Mystery of the Sintra Road): translation by Margaret Jull Costa, Dedalus Books, 2013
São Cristóvão (Saint Christopher): translation by Gregory Rabassa and Earl E. Fritz, Tagus Press, 2015

Adaptions

There have been two film versions of O Crime do Padre Amaro, a Mexican one in 2002 and a Portuguese version in 2005 which was edited out of a SIC television series, released shortly after the film (the film was by then the most seen Portuguese movie ever, though very badly received by critics, but the TV series, maybe due to being a slightly longer version of the same thing seen by a big share of Portuguese population, flopped and was rather ignored by audiences and critics).

Eça's works have been also adapted on Brazilian television. In 1988 Rede Globo produced O Primo Basílio in 35 episodes. Later, in 2007, a movie adaptation of the same novel was made by director Daniel Filho. In 2001 Rede Globo produced an acclaimed adaptation of Os Maias as a television serial in 40 episodes.

A movie adaptation of O Mistério da Estrada de Sintra was produced in 2007. The director had shortly before directed a series inspired in a whodunit involving the descendants of the original novel's characters (Nome de Código Sintra, Code Name Sintra), and some of the historical flashback scenes (reporting to the book's events) of the series were used in the new movie. The movie was more centered on Eça's and Ramalho Ortigão's writing and publishing of the original serial and the controversy it created and less around the book's plot itself.

In September 2014, film director João Botelho released the film Os Maias based on the novel with the same name Os Maias. The film cost a million and a half euros, having €600,000 from the Instituto do Cinema e Audiovisual (ICA), €170,000 from Câmara Municipal de Lisboa, €120,000 from Agência Nacional do Cinema (Ancine, the Brazilian akin from ICA), and a good part from Montepio Geral, as well as the purchase by RTP of the rights for the mini-series. The filming happened between October 14 and December 22 in 2013, and was shot in Ponte de Lima, Celorico de Basto, Guimarães and Lisbon.

Galleon Theatre Company, the resident producing company at the Greenwich Playhouse, London, has staged theatre adaptations by Alice de Sousa of Eça de Queiroz' novels. In 2001 the company presented Cousin Basílio, and in 2002 The Maias.

References

External links

 About Eça de Queiroz (formerly Queiroz, but out of date)
 
  
 
 
 Book: New edition of "The Relic" by Eça de Queiroz published – Tagus Press, UMD Portuguese American Journal
  Queiroz's/Queiroz's Idealism & Realism (idealismo e realismo)
 The sweet miracle, and English translation of Suave milagre

1845 births
1900 deaths
People from Póvoa de Varzim
Ambassadors of Portugal to France
Consuls
Portuguese male novelists
Portuguese journalists
Portuguese diplomats
University of Coimbra alumni
19th-century Portuguese novelists
19th-century journalists
Male journalists
19th-century male writers
Magazine founders